The 1980 New Zealand bravery awards were announced via a Special Honours List on 23 December 1980, and recognised five people for acts of bravery in 1979 or 1980.

Queen's Commendation for Brave Conduct
 Ronald Samson Lenz – senior traffic sergeant, Traffic Enforcement, Ministry of Transport, Christchurch.

 Driver David Ian White – lately Royal New Zealand Corps of Transport, 2nd Composite Squadron, Fort Dorset.

 Herbert Ernest Wash – superintendent, Wi Tako Prison.
 Hemi Te Muranui Anderson – prison officer, Wi Tako Prison.
 John Weston Kirton – second officer, Prison Staff College.

References

Bravery
Bravery awards
New Zealand bravery awards